The women's trampoline competition at the 2012 Summer Olympics took place at the North Greenwich Arena on 4 August.

Competition format

In the qualification round, each gymnast performed two routines: compulsory and voluntary. Scores for the two were summed, and the top eight competitors moved on to the final. In the final, each gymnast performed a single routine, with qualification scores not carrying over.

Results

Qualification

Final

References

Trampoline, Women's
2012 Women's
2012 in women's gymnastics
Women's events at the 2012 Summer Olympics